Stephen Gano West (born 1946) is an American quantitative psychologist and professor of psychology at Arizona State University. He was the editor-in-chief of the Journal of Personality from 1986 to 1991, of Psychological Methods  from 2001 to 2007, and of Multivariate Behavioral Research in 2015. He was also the president of the Society of Multivariate Experimental Psychology from 2007 to 2008. He was educated at Cornell University and the University of Texas at Austin, and received the Society for Personality and Social Psychology's Murray Award in 2000.

References

External links
 Faculty page
 
 

Living people
Arizona State University faculty
Academic journal editors
21st-century American psychologists
Personality psychologists
Cornell University alumni
University of Texas at Austin alumni
1946 births
Quantitative psychologists
20th-century American psychologists